In baseball, a strikeout (or strike-out) occurs when a batter accumulates three strikes during a time at bat (i.e. the batter fails to hit the ball in three successive pitches). It usually means the batter is out. A strikeout is a statistic recorded for both pitchers and batters, and is denoted by K.

Reggie Jackson holds the record for the most career strikeouts by a batter with 2,597. Jim Thome (2,548), Adam Dunn (2,379), Sammy Sosa (2,306), Alex Rodriguez (2,287), Miguel Cabrera (2,022), and Andrés Galarraga (2,003) are the only other hitters to strikeout over 2,000 times.

Key

List

Stats updated as of the end of the 2022 season.

Notes

References

External links

Major League Baseball statistics